Alojzy Orszulik S.A.C. (21 June 1928 – 21 February 2019) was a Polish Roman Catholic bishop.

Early life 
Orszulik was born in Poland and was ordained to the priesthood in 1957. He served as titular bishop of Vissalsa and as auxiliary bishop of the Roman Catholic Diocese of Siedlce, Poland, from 1989 to 1992. He then served as bishop of the Roman Catholic Diocese of Łowicz, Poland, from 1992 to 2004.

See also

Notes

1928 births
2019 deaths
Pallottine bishops
20th-century Roman Catholic bishops in Poland
21st-century Roman Catholic bishops in Poland